Annona dioica is a species of plant in the family Annonaceae. It is native to Bolivia, Brazil and Paraguay. Augustin Saint-Hilaire, the French botanist who first formally described the species, named it after its flowers which have different reproductive structures (δίς, dís, two in Greek) and (οἶκος, oîkos, house in Greek).

Description
It is a bush reaching 0.5-2 meters in height.  Its oval, hairy leaves are 5-16 by 3-15 centimeters and have rounded tips. Its petioles are 2.25-4.5 millimeters long and covered in wooly hair. Its inflorescences consist of 1-3 curved peduncles that are 2-3.4 centimeters long and covered in rust-colored hairs. Its flowers have a diameter of 6.75 centimeters.  Its calyx has triangular lobes.  Its yellow-green outer petals are oval-shaped, leathery, hairy and come to a shallow point at their tips.  The inner petals are smaller than the outer. Its stamens have 4 millimeter long filaments and anthers that are 4 times as long.

Reproductive biology
The pollen of Annona dioica is shed as permanent tetrads. Plants are androdioecious with flowers that are both male and female, or male only.  Pollination is mediated by the Cyclocephala atricapilla beetle.

Distribution and habitat
It grows at elevations of 80-1000 meters.  It blossoms in December.

Uses
Extracts from the leaves and wood contain bioactive compounds. Parts of the plant are used in Brazilian traditional medicine to treat a variety of ailments including diarrhea and rheumatism.

References

External links
 

dioica
Flora of Bolivia
Flora of Brazil
Flora of Paraguay
Traditional Brazilian medicine
Species described in 1825
Taxa named by Augustin Saint-Hilaire